The Poor and the Land: Report on the Salvation Army Colonies in the United States and at Hadleigh, England, with Scheme of National Land Resettlement is a 1905 book by H. Rider Haggard.

References

External links
Complete book at Internet Archive

1905 non-fiction books
Works by H. Rider Haggard
The Salvation Army